Merced High School is located in Merced, California, United States. It is a part of the Merced Union High School District.

The current enrollment is over 1,800 students in grades 9 through 12. The school is currently under Principal Marcus Knott and Associate Principals Brett Nickelson, Joel Sebastian, Phaedra Hofmann and Lea Smith.

Academics 
The Merced High School Advanced Placement program is open for any student who wishes to be challenged in the fields of chemistry, English, physics, government, Spanish, biology, calculus, statistics and studio art. The teachers at Merced High School try to ensure that their students work their hardest, which explains the high percentage of students who pass the Advanced Placement examinations with a score of 3, 4, or 5. Merced High School's Advanced Placement exam and test scores have earned it a place among the Top 1300 schools in the United States by Newsweek magazine. The school has also earned a Bronze Award from U.S. News & World Report, having been cited as one of the top 1,800 schools in the United States.

The Merced High Academic Decathlon team took the title of Merced County Champions (10 years in a row 2009-2018) and competed in Sacramento in March 2015, coming in 51st place in the state of California.

Special programs
The school has the Newcomer Program for newly arrived immigrants. As of February 2006, 80 students from Southeast Asia were a part of the program. Many of them were refugees from the Thamkabok refugee camp in Thailand. Many had never had formal education before, did not know how to use writing utensils, and did not know how to write their own names.

Student life
As of 2006 the school has an Asian Club, which has over 100 members. It is one of the largest groups at Merced High School. The Asian Club takes end of the year school trips and holds fundraising and social events.

Athletics 
Merced High School produced the 2015-2016 Gatorade National Softball Player of the Year. Madilyn Nickles received this award as the top high school softball player in America.

As of 2017, the Merced High boys' swimming team has won nine straight Central California Conference championships.

Merced High School has won the Central California Conference for three straight seasons in football (2014, 2015, and 2016).

Demographics
By January 1983, Merced High School North Campus had suddenly received over 200 Hmong refugee students, with almost all of them in English as a second language (ESL) programs. Between the northern hemisphere spring of 1982 and January 1983 the school doubled the size of its ESL program. A former assistant principal at Merced High North  said that many of the Hmong students valued education and had almost perfect school attendance.

Notable students
Margaret Dingeldein – member of the United States women's national water polo team during the 2004 Summer Olympics
Marvin Eastman – mixed martial arts fighter
Duke Fergerson – NFL football player for the Seattle Seahawks and the Buffalo Bills
Jerry Garvin – professional baseball player for the Toronto Blue Jays
Brian Fuentes – professional baseball player
Janet Leigh – actress
Eric A. McAfee – entrepreneur, venture capitalist, and philanthropist
Tony Slaton – NFL football player for the Los Angeles Rams and Dallas Cowboys
Thad Tillotson – professional baseball player
Rick Williams – professional baseball player

References

Further reading
 Vangay, Jonas. Hmong Parents' Cultural Attitudes and the Sex-Ratio Imbalance of Hmong Merced High School Graduates. Mong Pheng Community Inc., 1989.

External links

 Merced High School

High schools in Merced County, California
Public high schools in California
Merced High School
1922 establishments in California